Muazzampur Shahi Mosque is a medieval six-domed mosque located in the historic city of Sonargaon, Bangladesh.

Location 
The mosque is located in the village of Mohzumpur/Mazampur (formerly Muazzampur) in Jampur Union, Sonargaon Upazila, Narayanganj District. It is 10 kilometres southeast of the Madanpur Bus Stand situated on the Dhaka-Chittagong Highway.

History 
According to an inscription at the back of the mosque, it was built during the reign of the Sultan of Bengal Shamsuddin Ahmad Shah between 1432 and 1436. Although the inscription is broken, some parts have been deciphered. Its construction is attributed to officers Firuz Khan and Ali Musa.

South of the mosque, lies the one-storey mazar (mausoleum) of Shah Langar, who is also referred to by locals as Shah Alam. He was said to have been a religious nobleman from Baghdad who gave up his riches to live an ascetic lifestyle. He settled in Sonargaon, where he died and was buried. There are many other paved structures around the mosque whose identity has not been confirmed.

Description 
The historic mosque still survives after various stages of reform. A modern mosque has been built by renovating this mosque with an eastern extension by a veranda and a newly built minaret to its northeast. At present the area of the mosque is about 12.92 meters by 9.3 meters. It is long on the northern and southern boundaries. The mosque has 3 isles and 2 bays. The mosque has a total of 6 domes.

The interior size of the mosque is 9.3 m by 6.8 m. The walls are 1.8 meters thick. There are 3 arched doors on the east wall and 1 similar door on the north and south walls. The central mihrab on the west wall is adorned with black stone pillars and other crafts including bells and chains. The 6 domes of the mosque are built on 2 inner pillars and surrounding walls.

The size of the bricks used in the mosque is 7 by 7 by 1.5 inches. Most of the terracotta slabs on the back wall of the central mihrab still survive.

Gallery

See also 
List of mosques in Bangladesh
History of Bengal

References

External links

Bengal Sultanate mosques
Narayanganj District
Mosques in Bangladesh
Mosques completed in the 1430s